Kidron is a surname. Notable people with the surname include:

 Adam Kidron, British-born ex-music producer
 Assaf Kidron (born 1976), Israeli sculptor
 Beeban Kidron (born 1961), Baroness Kidron, British television and film director
 Michael Kidron (1930–2003), British cartographer and Marxist
 Peretz Kidron (1933–2011), Israeli peace activist